Dorothy Jean Hailes  (born 22 June 1926, died 27 November 1988) was an Australian medical practitioner in the 20th century. Hailes, along with a group of doctors, was instrumental in the creation of the Australasian Menopause Society.

Early life and education
Hailes was born on 22 June 1926 in Ascot Vale, Melbourne to surgeon William Allan Hailes and Mary Maud Whitfield. She had an older sister and a younger sister.

Hailes attended Melbourne Girls Grammar where in 1943, she reached head prefect. Hailes went on to attend the University of Melbourne where she obtained her MB, BS in 1949. She then began medical training at the Royal Melbourne Hospital where she completed her medical training as a resident medical officer in 1960.

Career
Hailes worked at Travancore Developmental Centre as an officer who worked with children who were intellectually disabled. She overcame the neglect by doctors of the 'minor' symptoms of ageing women. She and physicist Robert Greenblatt got to know each other in the late 1960s in the United States and he helped her fix menopausal women's health needs. In 1962 Hailes joined the Australian Red Cross Society, where she was a medical officer in the Victorian Division's blood transfusion service for ten years.

Hailes confronted Australian medical practitioners for their neglect to promote this treatment (due to side-effect concerns). Professor Bryan Hudson and Dr. Henry Burger both supported Hailes. Hailes soon became an honorary clinical assistant at the Department of endocrinology and diabetes at the hospital and for nine years menopausal women went to Hailes for their menopausal related issues. Hailes, along with sympathetic woman doctors established and staffed a weekly half day clinic which accepted patients without requiring them to submit a medical referral. In 1971, Hailes created Australia's first health clinic, which was one of the first clinics in the world to address menopause.

Hailes joined Monash University in 1972 as part of the health services of the students of the University before returning to the University of Melbourne in a similar role for three years later.

Hailes established a second clinic at the Royal Women's Hospital in 1976 before becoming a menopause counselor from 1978 to 1986. She also was a clinical assistant at Royal Women's Hospital.

The mainstream medicine industry supported Hailes for developing clinical and research expertise that was related to the health issues of older women. Hailes (with the Burger) developed a paper on a hormone replacement therapy research program titled `Oestrogens and Menopausal and Post-menopausal Women’. The Medical Journal of Australia published this research program in 1977. She created a conference on menopause that was nationally covered five years later along with other doctors which led to the formation of Australasian Menopause Society. At society meetings, Hailes funded the Best Paper annual prize.

Hailes raised public awareness that was intent on confronting myths on the issues related to menopause. She appeared on talkback radio and she spoke to community groups. She wrote a booklet — The Middle Years in 1980 — which in six years ran three editions. She worked with the feminist movement's health service establishment concurrent campaign.  Hailes was appointed AM in 1986.

Personal life
Hailes married medical practitioner Henry Buckhurst Kay on 21 November 1951 in Christ Church, South Yarra and together they had three children, including Janet Hailes Michelmore. On 27 November 1988 Hailes died of cancer at South Yarra. Her body was cremated soon after.

Posthumous impact
In 1992, the Jean Hailes Foundation for Women's Health was established to ensure that Hailes's work is continued in clinical research and educative dimension.

The Jean Hailes Research Unit at Monash University, which connects the university to clinical services based in translation of knowledge, was named in Hailes' honour.

References

1926 births
1988 deaths
Australian endocrinologists
Women endocrinologists
Deaths from cancer in Victoria (Australia)
20th-century Australian women
20th-century Australian medical doctors
Women gynaecologists
Australian gynaecologists
Medical doctors from Melbourne
University of Melbourne alumni
University of Melbourne women
People from Ascot Vale, Victoria
People educated at Melbourne Girls Grammar
Australian health activists